James Henry Wilson (29 February 1884 – 1 July 1934) was an Australian rules footballer who played with Essendon in the Victorian Football League (VFL).

Notes

External links 

1884 births
1934 deaths
Australian rules footballers from Melbourne
Essendon Football Club players
Australian military personnel of World War I
People from Fitzroy, Victoria
Military personnel from Melbourne